Jean-Michel Aeby (born 23 May 1966) is a Swiss football manager and a former player.

Coaching career
Aeby was hired by Bellinzona on 26 August 2021. He resigned from the club on 19 April 2022, despite the club in promotion position at the time.

References

1966 births
Living people
Swiss men's footballers
Étoile Carouge FC players
AC Bellinzona players
FC Lausanne-Sport players
Servette FC players
FC Meyrin players
CS Chênois players
Association football midfielders
Swiss Super League players
Switzerland international footballers
Swiss football managers
Servette FC managers
Neuchâtel Xamax FCS managers
FC Stade Nyonnais managers
FC Biel-Bienne managers
Yverdon-Sport FC managers
AC Bellinzona managers